Shine on You is a drama series produced by Hong Kong broadcaster TVB and was first aired from September 13 to October 22, 2004 in the prime time 8:00 to 9:00 pm slot. Consisting of 30 episodes it was produced by Mui Siu Ching and featured a cast consisting of amongst others Bobby Au Yeung, Kenix Kwok and Michael Tao. The series concerned the lives of student and teachers at a band three (the lowest classification) school in Hong Kong. Michael Tao and Kenix Kwok were paired together for the first time since Detective Investigation Files III ended 7 years prior to this series.

Following its first broadcast the series was repeated from July, 24 to September 1, 2006 in the noon time (11:45-12:45) slot, and again from July 22, 2010 in the early evening (17:55-18:25) slot.

Synopsis
Due to office politics Ga Jai Choi (Bobby Au Yeung) a successful business executive  is assigned to become the headmaster of a school. The school (the Sam Shui Agriculture and Fishing General Staff Association Wan Leung Chan Charity Funding Porry Wan Ting Memorial Secondary School 22, Perth Street, Argyle Kowloon), is a failing one having become a sink school for students other schools do not want and is threatened with closure by the education board, however the school was endowed as a memorial by the parents of tycoon Yin Guo Rong (Bowie Wu) who is unwilling to allow the school to close without doing his best to save it, he is therefore convinced by Ga Jai Choi's rivals to send his most able aide, Ga, to be its head master.

Ga Jai Choi resents being diverted from his business career but dare not go against his employer directly, he therefore acts to appear to be doing his best to save the school, which he sees as a lost cause, while instituting policies which he hopes will speed its demise. He begins by threatening a clear out of the teaching staff however all he does is to motivate the staff who wish to protect their rice bowls.

Ga's efforts are taken at face value by Lam Ying Yun (Shirley Yeung) a teacher straight of college and Wong Yerk Se (Kenix Kwok), a teacher who because of her own past has resolved never to give up on even the most unruly of students. Beginning a relationship first with Lam and then, when she leaves to continue her education abroad, Wong wheeler-dealer teacher Cheng Zhing Leung (Michael Tao) is forced to question as to why he became a teacher. With their teachers acting with new vigour the students are motivated to believe that they can achieve and be more than the failures that society has branded them.

Despite his initial intentions Ga's policies actually cause the school's results to improve and see the pupils, their parents and staff pulling together, however the improvement is not so great to make the school's survival certain. Ga realises that he has come to care for the school and its students and joins everyone for a final plea against its closure.

Cast

Last Page
China Centralized Television Broadcast Limited
©MMIV

TVB dramas
2004 Hong Kong television series debuts
2004 Hong Kong television series endings